Centreville High School may refer to one of the following:

Centreville High School (Fairfax County, Virginia)
 Centreville High School (Maryland) in Centreville, Maryland
 Centreville High School (Michigan) in Centreville, St. Joseph County, Michigan

See also
Centerville High School (disambiguation)